Joseph Prokop is a former professional American football player who played punter for seven seasons for the Green Bay Packers, San Diego Chargers, New York Jets, San Francisco 49ers, Miami Dolphins, and New York Giants.

References

1960 births
American football punters
Green Bay Packers players
San Diego Chargers players
New York Jets players
San Francisco 49ers players
Miami Dolphins players
New York Giants players
Cal Poly Pomona Broncos football players
Living people
American sportspeople convicted of crimes
National Football League replacement players